Chiredzi  Football Club is a Zimbabwean football club based in Chiredzi. They play in the top division of Zimbabwean football, the Zimbabwe Premier Soccer League.

Stadium
Currently the team plays at the 3000 capacity Gibbo Stadium.

References

External links
 SOCCERWAY
 FUTBOL24

Football clubs in Zimbabwe